Eodorcadion lutshniki is a species of beetle in the family Cerambycidae. It was described by Plavilstshikov in 1937. It is known from Mongolia.

Subspecies
 Eodorcadion lutshniki altanelsense Heyrovský, 1973
 Eodorcadion lutshniki bicoloratum Danilevsky, 2007
 Eodorcadion lutshniki burenum Danilevsky, 2007
 Eodorcadion lutshniki lutshniki (Plavilstshikov, 1937)

References

Dorcadiini
Beetles described in 1937